Gilles Emptoz-Lacôte (born 15 December 1977) is a French diver. He competed in three events at the 2000 Summer Olympics.

References

1977 births
Living people
French male divers
Olympic divers of France
Divers at the 2000 Summer Olympics
Divers from Paris